Boké Baralande Airport  is an airport serving Boké, the capital of the Boké Region of Guinea.

The Boke non-directional beacon (Ident: OK) is located on the field.

See also
Transport in Guinea
List of airports in Guinea

References

External links
OpenStreetMap - Boké
OurAirports - Boké
SkyVector - Boké

Airports in Guinea